Isogona natatrix is a species of moth of the family Erebidae. It is found in North America, including Texas.

External links
Images
Butterflies and Moths of North America 

Boletobiinae